This is an outline of Sport in Bedfordshire, a county in England.

American football
The Bedfordshire Blue Raiders are members of the British American Football League.

Cricket
The Bedfordshire County Cricket Club is Bedfordshire's county cricket club. They are classed as one of the 'Minor Counties' in the English domestic cricket structure, representing the historic county of Bedfordshire in the Minor Counties Championship and the MCCA Knockout Trophy.

The club play most of their matches at Wardown Park, Luton.

Other cricket venues in the county include:
 Ampthill Park, Ampthill
 The Vale, Flitwick
 Goldington Bury, Bedford
 Lancot Park, Dunstable
 Southill Park Cricket Club, Southill
 Bedford Modern School, Bedford

The club has produced several cricketers who have made an impact on the first-class game:
 Louis Bookman
 Tom Clark
 Alastair Cook
 Alf Gover
 Wayne Larkins
 Geoff Millman
 Monty Panesar

Field hockey
Leighton Buzzard Hockey Club, established in 1901, have 4 Men's, 4 Ladies teams of all ability and a junior section; starting age of 5 years old.

Football 
Luton Town Football Club is by far the most successful and supported team in the county, though there are numerous other teams competing at various levels. The Bedfordshire County Football Association is the governing body of football in the county, and run a number of cups at different levels for teams in the area.

Luton Town Football Club

Luton is the home town of Luton Town Football Club who currently play in the Championship, the 2nd division of the English football league system after a five-year spell in the National Conference League (following their 30 point deduction from the Football League during the 2008/09 season), followed by back-to-back promotions in 2018 and 2019. They are the biggest and most successful team in the county and have enjoyed spells in the highest flight of English football. Their nickname, "The Hatters", dates back to when Luton had a substantial millinery industry.

Levels 5-6
Conference National
The top flight of the Football Conference. Teams promoted from the Conference, pending they meet certain rules, are eligible to play in the English Football League.

Levels 7-8
Southern Football League

Luton Town FC was one of the 16 founding members of the league back in 1894. Currently, winners of the league are promoted to the Conference South (or North sometimes due to team balancing. 

Division 1 Central
A.F.C. Dunstable
A.F.C. Kempston Rovers
Barton Rovers F.C.
Bedford Town F.C.
Biggleswade F.C.
Biggleswade Town F.C.

Levels 9-11
Spartan South Midlands League
The Spartan South Midlands League consists of teams from London and the Home Counties. The league feeds the Southern Football League and Isthmian League.

Premier League
Arlesey Town F.C.
Dunstable Town F.C.
Leighton Town F.C.
Division 1
Ampthill Town F.C.
Bedford F.C.
Langford F.C.
Stotfold F.C.
Division 2
The 61 F.C. (Luton)
Totternhoe F.C.

United Counties Football League
The United Counties Football League covers Northamptonshire and Bedfordshire, as well as parts of Berkshire, Buckinghamshire, Cambridgeshire, Hertfordshire, and Lincolnshire. It has a total of four divisions: 2 first team, and 2 reserve team divisions. Clubs in the Premier Division are eligible to enter the FA Cup in the preliminary round stages, and those with floodlights are eligible to enter the FA Vase. There are also knockout cups for the Premier/Division One clubs and for the Reserve Divisions clubs.

Premier Division South
Biggleswade United F.C.
Potton United F.C.

Levels 11-15
Bedfordshire County Football League
Amateur teams in Bedfordshire compete in a league which comprises tiers 11-15 in the English football league system. The league has 71 members spread across five divisions. When a club wins the league championship, it also gains the opportunity to join either the United Counties Football League or the Spartan South Midlands League.

The league runs separate league cups for each division – the Premier Division clubs play for the Britannia Cup, Divisions One clubs play for the Centenary Cup, Division Two sides compete for the Jubilee Cup and Division Three teams play in the Watson Shield.

For the 2009–10 season, the teams are distributed thus:

(Levels 11-12 updated to 2021-22 season)

Premier Division
Level 11
AFC Kempston Town & Bedford College
AFC Oakley
Bedford Albion
Biggleswade F.C. Reserves
Biggleswade United F.C. U23
Caldecote
Cranfield United F.C.
Crawley Green Reserves
Elstow Abbey
Flitwick Town F.C.
Marston Shelton Rovers
Queens Park Crescents
Riseley Sports
Sharnbrook
Shefford Town & Campton Reserves
Stevington

Division One
Level 12
Arlesey Town U23
Barton Rovers Reserves
Cranfield United Reserves
Crawley Green U23
Flitwick Town Reserves
Henlow F.C.
Ickwell & Old Warden F.C.
KA Great Barford F.C.
Lea Sports PSG
Pitstone & Ivinghoe United Reserves
Potton United Reserves
Sporting Lewsey Park
St Josephs
Stotfold Development
Totternhoe Reserves
Wilstead

Division Two
Level 13
Bromham United
Cranfield United Reserves
Dunton
Eastcotts
Marabese Ceramics
Meltis Albion
Oakley Sports M&DH Reserves
Potton United Reserves
Queens Park Crescents
St. Joseph
Stopsley Park
Sundon Park Rangers
Westoning
Woburn Athletic

Division Three
Level 14
Bedford Park Rangers
Clifton
Goldington
Great Barford
Ickwell & Old Warden Reserves
Kempston Hammers Sports
Marsh Leys
Potton Town
Riseley Sports
Royal Oak Kempston
Stevington
Westoning Reserves
Wilshamstead Reserves

Division Four
Level 15
AFC Goldington
Bedford Panthers
Caldecote 'A'
Clifton Reserves
Dinamo Flitwick
Dunton Reserves
Elstow Abbey Reserves
Flitwick Town Reserves
Goldington Hammers
Kempston Athletic
Kempston Conservative Club Sports
Marston Shelton Rovers Reserves
Sandy Reserves
Thurleigh
Wootton Village

Golf
There are a number of golf courses and clubs across Bedfordshire. Luton has two 18 hole golf courses. One in Stockwood Park and the other at Warden Hill. A driving range and 9 hole golf course can also be found at Tea Green.

Greyhound racing
Greyhound racing is held at Henlow Stadium and was held at Luton Stadium (1931-1973), Queens Park Football Ground (Bedford) (1975-1982), Cardington Road (1929), Renhold (1931) and Kimbolton Road/Putnoe Lane (1931). Henlow is the only venue that was affiliated to the sports governing body the National Greyhound Racing Club, the others were known as flapping tracks, which was the nickname given to independent tracks.

Kayaking
Viking Kayak Club organise the Bedford Kayak Marathon with canoe racing held along the Embankment on Bedford's riverside and organise national ranking Canoe Slalom events at the Cardington Artificial Slalom Course (CASC), which was the first artificial whitewater course in the UK. CASC is also the venue each year for the UK's National Inter Clubs Slalom Finals, the largest canoe slalom event by participation in the UK.

Pool
There are two established pool leagues in Luton. One is the Luton & District Monday Pool League, which uses old style pub rules. The other is the South Beds Pool League, which competes on Thursday evenings and uses world rules. Both leagues cover the areas of Luton, Stopsley, Houghton Regis and Dunstable.

Rowing
Rowing is a major part of the sports scene of Bedford, with a number of regatta events hosted throughout the year from February through to October; the most significant of these being Bedford Regatta, which in terms of numbers of crews participating is the second largest in the country.

Rugby
Bedford Teams
Bedford Athletic
Bedford Blues
Bedford Queens
Bedford Swifts
Bedford Tigers (Rugby League)
Luton Teams
Luton Rugby Club
Stockwood Park
Vauxhall Motors RFC
Others
Ampthill RUFC
Biggleswade Rugby Club
Cranfield University
Dunstablians
Kempston
Leighton Buzzard RFC
Sharnbrook and Colworth

Other sports
Speedway racing was staged at Luton Stadium in the mid 1934-1937.

Venues
Bedford Autodrome Racing circuit
Bedford International Athletics Stadium Athletics Stadium
Creasey Park 3,200 Capacity Football Stadium
Goldington Road 6,000 Seater Rugby Stadium#
Henlow Stadium Greyhound racing stadium
Kenilworth Road 10,000 Seater Football Stadium
Wardown Park Cricket Field

References

External links
 Bedfordshire Football League
 Bedfordshire FA